The Plumper Islands, also referred to as the Plumper Group, are a small group of island located between Hanson Island and the Pearse Islands in the Queen Charlotte Strait region of the Central Coast of British Columbia.

References

Archipelagoes of British Columbia
Central Coast of British Columbia